The 2013–14 season was Ergotelis' 84th season in existence, 8th season in the Super League Greece, and the first since the club's latest promotion from the Football League. Ergotelis also participated in the Greek cup, entering the competition in the Second Round. The team managed to secure its participation in next year's season with relative ease, while also achieving a record 44 points on the table, finishing in the 7th place. This is the best finish in the club's history in the Super League.

Players

The following players have departed in mid-season

Out of team 

Note: Flags indicate national team as has been defined under FIFA eligibility rules. Players and Managers may hold more than one non-FIFA nationality.

Transfers

In

Promoted from youth system

Total spending:  0.000 €

Out 
 
Total income:  700.000 €

Expenditure:   700.000 €

Managerial changes

Pre-season and friendlies

Pre-season friendlies

Mid-season friendlies

Post-season friendlies

Competitions

Overview 

Last updated: 24 April 2014

Super League Greece

League table

Results summary

Matches

Greek Cup

Second round

Matches

Statistics

Goal scorers

Last updated: 25 April 2014

References

Ergotelis
Ergotelis F.C. seasons